Sam Meikle (born 1971) is an Australian writer and director best known for his work in television. He has won several Australian Writers' Guild Awards. He is the son of actor Richard Meikle.

Select filmography
Television
Home and Away
Rescue: Special Ops
Neighbours
Out of the Blue
All Saints

References

External links

Sam Meikle at National Film and Sound Archive

Australian writers
Living people
1971 births